Yevade Subramanyam is a 2015 Indian Telugu-language coming-of-age philosophical drama film written and directed by debutant Nag Ashwin. Produced by Priyanka Dutt, and Swapna Dutt, the film stars Nani, Malavika Nair, Vijay Deverakonda, and Ritu Varma while Krishnam Raju, Nassar, and Kireeti Damaraju play supporting roles. The plot follows Subramanyam (Nani), a corporate man who sets out on a journey of self-discovery.  Much of the filming took place at the Everest Base Camp in Nepal, becoming the first Indian film to be shot at the location.

Released on 21 March 2015, the film received mixed to positive reviews from the critics. Nani's performance and message-oriented script received praise but the film is criticised for slow-paced narration.

Plot

Subramanyam "Subbu" is a materialistic IIM graduate who is very ambitious. His boss is Pasupathi. They aim to buy his rival Ramaiah's company but fail at it. Subbu, with his wit and ability to manipulate people, makes Ramaiah's employees sell their shares. With this being Pasupathi's biggest success, Subbu gets engaged to his boss's daughter Rhea. 
During the engagement ceremony, a childhood friend, Rishi, enters his life. Rishi is very energetic and opposite in the character to Subbu. Rishi believes living every moment of the life to its fullest. He is a true artist of life, who lives and never thinks about living. The same day they encounter a free-spirited girl Anandi in a pub. Rishi reveals his dream is to travel with Subbu to Doodh Kasi, a holy lake in the Himalayas.

Rhea, Subbu and everyone in Pasupathi's reign think that they have conquered Ramaiah's company but they are shocked when they lose some shares, threatening Pasupathi's buy-out of Ramaiah's company. This enrages Pasupathi who threatens to fire Subbu and break his engagement to his daughter. Subbu promises Pasupathi that he will win, and goes to Ramaiah asking him to sell his company. Ramaiah rejects his offer humbly. Subbu feels low, and Rishi mentions Doodh Kasi. Rishi is amused when he finds out that a shareholder's value has upset Subbu. Rishi has Subbu promise about a trip to Doodh Kasi in exchange for returning the shareholder's details. They go to the person who owns the shares and find out that he is Anandi's father and that her signature can make Subbu win. Subbu and Rishi learn that Anandi is a very lonely girl, who has no family or friends. They befriend her. She keeps postponing signing over the "shares" to Subbu even though it is foremost on Subbu's mind, who always looks to make Anandi sign on the shares. On the way to meet Rhea, Rishi and Subbu see a little girl injured on the road and take her to the hospital. Late by a few minutes (i.e., ten minutes), the girl succumbs to her head injuries and blood loss. Subbu forgets about it but Rishi cannot. A drunk Rishi argues with Subbu that the life they are leading is not the life they must live. Enraged, Subbu points to Rishi the sordid life he is leading without earning his living, which makes Rishi leave.

The next day, Subbu gets a phone call from a police officer who tells him that Rishi has died in a road accident. A shocked Subbu and Anandi go to Kolkata for Rishi's funeral. There Anandi promises Subbu the shares if he will go with her to Doodh Kasi to scatter Rishi's ashes in the lake.

A major part of the remaining story deals with the journey of Subbu and Anandi to Doodh Kasi with the help of a guide Pemba and the change in the mindset of Subbu from a money-minded calculative person to one who learns to live in the moment. In the process, he has a chance encounter with a man named Robert who is a multi-billionaire but still has a rough journey planned in Himalayas. When Subbu asks him the reason, he says that for the last forty - forty five years of his life he has been running towards fame and money even extending his retirement, and keeping relations and enjoyable moments at bay. But when at last he wished to live life with his wife Mary, unfortunately, she died. Subbu also ends up helping a pregnant woman who was in labour and experiences joy when he lifts the baby into his arms. The remaining story also shows how love blooms between Subbu and Anandi. After having come back from Doodh Kasi, Subbu, now a changed man, cancels his engagement with Rhea and approaches Ramaiah to give his company back to him and also applies for the job in the same firm. The movie ends with Subbu asking Anandi to give him a 'share' in her life (meaning : he proposes her for the marriage, indirectly).

Cast

 Nani as Subramanyam "Subbu"
 Malavika Nair as Anandi "Nandi"
 Vijay Deverakonda as Rishi
 Ritu Varma as Riya
 Krishnam Raju as Ramaiah
 Nassar as Pasupathi
 Rajesh Vivek as Pemba
 Sowcar Janaki as Susheela 
 Prathap Pothen as man in butterfly park 
 Srinivas Avasarala as Prabhakar
 Pavitra Lokesh as Rishi's mother
 Kireeti Damaraju as Kireeti
 Sivannarayana as Nandi's neighbour
 Sri Sudha Bhimireddy as Naina
 Akhil Kondepudi as young Rishi
 Karate Kalyani as Rama
 Jayanthi Reddy
 Vaishnavi Merla
 Sindhu Kaza
 Padmaja Lanka

Production
Yevade Subramanyam was produced by Priyanka Dutt and her sister Swapna Dutt, who is based in Hyderabad. They are the daughters of C. Ashwini Dutt, a well known Indian film producer and the founder of Vyjayanthi Movies. Priyanka Dutt studied filmmaking from UCLA.

Development
Filming near the Himalaya Mountains took forty days. The film differs from the television serial by location. For television, director Gowarikar shot scenes in Lukla in the Khumbu region of Nepal at 2,860 meters above sea level and then changed locations to Uttarakhand. Contrarily, Yevade Subramanyam is the only Indian film to be shot at some of Everest's highest points.

In attempting to prepare himself, director Nag Ashwin trained on an inclined treadmill for several months prior to the shoot. Out of the 33 person filming crew, only 27 made it through to completion. Several members suffered from altitude sickness and other ailments and were taken to Kathmandu for treatment.

To begin filming, production unit first departed Lukla and trekked to Gokyo and then to Chola Pass. However, during the shoot, cast and crew suffered from altitude sickness, cold weather, and a limited cuisine. Humorous moments during the shot included a makeup man being chased by a baby yak and the director being hit by a horse. The director took it as a good omen that during filming he met and spoke with Amelia Hillary, granddaughter of Sir Edmund Hillary.

Marketing 
The Team behind Yevade Subramanyam came up with a unique promotion strategy for their film as a Sankranti gift where in Nani would read the news bulletin on TV 5 news Channel. On January 10, a "first look" motion poster was released featuring Nani.

Dubbed versions
This film was dubbed and released in Tamil as Yaar Indha Mani. Later, Goldmines Telefilms dubbed and released the film in Hindi on YouTube as Yeh Hai Zindagi on 19 December 2019.

Soundtrack
The soundtrack was composed by Radhan of Andala Rakshasi fame and Released by Lahari Music.

Ilayaraja composed one song "Challa Gaali" adapted from his own song "Thendral Vanthu" which was composed for Tamil film Avatharam (1995).

Awards and nominations

References

External links
 

2015 films
2010s Telugu-language films
2010s business films
Trading films
Indian adventure drama films
Mountaineering films
Films based on French novels
Films scored by Ilaiyaraaja
Films set in Kolkata
Films set in West Bengal
Films set in Nepal
Films shot in Nepal
Indian business films
2010s adventure drama films
2015 directorial debut films
2015 drama films
Films about Mount Everest
Films shot in Kathmandu
Films directed by Nag Ashwin